Balthasar Seña (c. 1590 at Barcelona, Spain – 19 July 1614 at Guarambare, Paraguay) was a Spanish Jesuit missionary and linguist in South America.

Life

He entered the Jesuit novitiate at Tarragona, Aragon, in 1608. Before completing his studies he volunteered for the Guarani missions of Paraguay, and sailed from Lisbon in company with the veteran missionary, Father Juan Romero, in 1610, continuing his studies on the voyage.

The rest of his life was spent at the Guarani mission town of Guarambare or with the Itatines, whose language he studied and reduced to dictionary form. He defended them against slave-dealers, and declined an offered preferment at Santa Fe in order to remain with his mission work.

Attending the sick throughout a contagious epidemic, he  himself fell ill and died. His remains were afterwards taken up and reinterred at the Jesuit college at Asuncion.

References

Attribution
 The entry cites:
Lozano, Hist. de la Comp. de J. en Paraguay, II (Madrid, 1754-5).

1590 births
1614 deaths
People from Barcelona
17th-century Spanish Jesuits
Spanish Roman Catholic missionaries
Jesuit missionaries in Paraguay
Missionary linguists
Jesuits from Catalonia